Taras Natyshak (born October 12, 1977) is a former politician in Ontario, Canada. He was a New Democratic member of the Legislative Assembly of Ontario from 2011 to 2022, representing the riding of Essex.

Background
Natyshak was born in Essex County, Ontario. Natyshak studied political science and labour studies at the University of Windsor. He served as director of training for the Laborers' International Union of North America (LIUNA). He and his wife Jennifer live in Belle River with their two children.

Politics
Natyshak ran as the New Democrat candidate in the federal elections of 2006, 2008 and 2011 in the riding of Essex. He failed to win in each year.

In the 2011 provincial election, he ran as the New Democrat candidate in the riding of Essex. He defeated Progressive Conservative candidate Dave Brister by 1,368 votes. He was re-elected in the 2014 provincial election defeating PC candidate Ray Cecile by 17,914 votes.

He was the party's critic for labour issues.

On June 24, 2020, Natyshak saw controversy after he called Ontario Premier Doug Ford a 'piece of shit' during Question Period when Ford was talking about reopening of the Windsor area during the COVID-19 pandemic. He later apologized for using "unparliamentarily language."

On December 10, 2021, Natyshak announced he would not seek re-election in the 2022 Ontario general election for a fourth term.

Electoral record

Provincial elections

Federal elections

References

External links

1977 births
Canadian people of Ukrainian descent
Trade unionists from Ontario
Living people
Ontario New Democratic Party MPPs
People from Essex County, Ontario
New Democratic Party candidates for the Canadian House of Commons
University of Windsor alumni
21st-century Canadian politicians